Saydabad District is a district of Maidan Wardak Province, Afghanistan. The district is known for its pleasant climate, including hilly vegetation, streams, and orchards. The district was a popular retreat for Kabul residents until an increase in ISAF-Taliban violence in the late 2000s. The city of Saydabad serves as the district capital. With a population of 114,793, it is the most populous district of the province.

The district is within the heartland of the Wardak tribe of Pashtuns.

Security and politics
On 17 November 2009, Afghan National Security Forces (ANSF) assisted by NATO International Security Assistance Force (ISAF), raided a compound killing five people. Wardak provincial officials stated that at least four of the people killed were militants. Officials have not said whether the fifth casualty, a woman, was also a militant. Two militants were also arrested.

As of 2009, Sayadabad is one of the districts participating in the Afghan Public Protection Force program.
Sayed Abad district is one of the unsecure districts of Wardak province Afghanistan. It has good climate, good weather, good agriculture, and good water and sanitation system.

Villages in Saydabad District

See also
Districts of Afghanistan

References

External links
UNHCR map of Sayd Abad District

Districts of Maidan Wardak Province